Cinzia Ragusa (born 24 May 1977) is an Italian water polo player who competed in the 2004 Summer Olympics in Athens, Greece, where she won a gold medal.

She was born in Catania.

See also
 Italy women's Olympic water polo team records and statistics
 List of Olympic champions in women's water polo
 List of Olympic medalists in water polo (women)
 List of World Aquatics Championships medalists in water polo

References
 
 Italian Swimming Federation Profile

External links
 
 
 
 

1977 births
Living people
Italian female water polo players
Water polo centre backs
Olympic gold medalists for Italy in water polo
Water polo players at the 2004 Summer Olympics
Water polo players at the 2008 Summer Olympics
Medalists at the 2004 Summer Olympics
World Aquatics Championships medalists in water polo
Sportspeople from Catania
21st-century Italian women